Friendship Bell may refer to:

 Bell Circles II, Portland, Oregon, U.S., also known as the Sapporo Friendship Bell
 Kobe Bell, Seattle, Washington, U.S., also known as the Friendship Bell
 Korean Bell of Friendship, Los Angeles, California, U.S.